The 2021 ONEFA season was the forty-second season of the Organización Nacional Estudiantil de Fútbol Americano (ONEFA). The season is scheduled began on 22 October 2021. No champion was crowned in the top-tier 14 Grandes Conference while the Lobos UAdeC of the Autonomous University of Coahuila won the second-tier Conferencia Nacional  after defeating the Borregos Salvajes Querétaro 13–9 in the final.

Background

Previous season
The 2020 ONEFA season was cancelled due to the COVID-19 pandemic. This was the first time in the 42-year history of the Organización Nacional Estudiantil de Fútbol Americano (ONEFA) that the highest category of the circuit was not played.

Teams
The 28 teams were allocated as follows:
13 teams in the 14 Grandes Conference in two groups
6 teams in the Conferencia Nacional 
7 teams in the Conferencia Sur-Centro in two groups that includes one invitee

The Aztecas UDLAP were supposed to be members of Group 1 of the 14 Grandes Conference, but declined to participate, dropping the amount of teams in the top-tier conference to 13 for the season.

14 Grandes

Conferencia Nacional

Conferencia Sur-Centro

14 Grandes

Regular season

Week One

References

American football in Mexico
Sports events cancelled due to the COVID-19 pandemic
2021 in American football
2021 in Mexican sports